The Moneen DVD: It All Started with a Red Stripe is the first official DVD released by Moneen, an Indie rock band based in Brampton, Ontario, Canada. It was released in Canada and the United States on May 13, 2008. The DVD has four different sections: a documentary, a live performance, tour diaries and music videos.

The start to this may be the end to another
The Start to this May be the End to Another is a documentary about Moneen. The film mainly focuses on the pre-production process of The Red Tree album. The band moves into a house in Baltimore, Maryland, to work on pre-production with the producer Brian McTernan. The band struggles to develop demos to send to Vagrant Records in preparation for recording a new album. Video clips from the past are interspersed throughout the film to show how the band had developed until pre-production of The Red Tree. The film can also be watched with all the band members providing commentary.

Live at The Mod Club
The second section of the DVD consists of a live performance by Moneen at The Mod Club Theatre in Toronto on May 10, 2007. Nine songs from the performance are included. Three songs from the performance are not included on the DVD, along with any talking that occurred between songs.

Tour diaries
There are two separate sections of tour journals: U.S. tour diaries and Canadian tour diaries. These videos were previously released on the Internet while Moneen was on these tours. The videos are not really diaries, but more just videos showing what the band does for fun on tour, and how they interact with fans.

Music videos
Five music videos are included on the DVD. Four of these videos had previously been in rotation at music television stations. The fifth video is a video made and directed by Kenny Bridges for "The Song I Swore to Never Sing".

DVD track listing
 The Start To This May Be The End To Another (72:39)
 Live at The Mod Club
 Don't Ever Tell Locke What He Can't Do (3:34)
 If Tragedy's Appealing, The Disaster's An Addiction (4:41)
 Start Angry...End Mad (5:21)
 There Are A Million Reasons For Why This May Not Work... And Just One Good One For Why It Will (7:41)
 The Day No One Needed To Know (6:37)
 Tonight, I'm Gone (6:32)
 His Own Anomaly (6:39)
 The Passing Of America (11:45)
 Bonus - The Song I Swore To Never Sing (3:21)
Tour Diaries
U.S. Tour Diaries (31:47)
 Handball
 Everything Explodes
 Dance Party Remix
 Fun in the U.S.A.
 Pizza
 Halloween
 Kenny Dance
 Friends for Life
 Moneen Police
 Parking Lot
 Hippy Fight
 Radio
 Poker Smash
 Sandhill
 Spinning Plate of Death Gang
 Three Notes at Once
Canadian Tour Diaries (18:11)
 A Short Time Ago in An RV Soon to be Far Away...
 Clearing the Poop-chute
 .moneen.: The Gathering
 Fun with Balls
 Peter Sings the Hits
 Challenge!
 Music Videos
 If Tragedy's Appealing, Then Disaster's An Addiction 
 Don't Ever Tell Locke What He Can't Do
 The Song I Swore to Never Sing
 Are We Really Happy with who We Are Right Now?
 Start Angry, End Mad

Personnel

The start to this may be the end to another
 Filmed, directed, and edited by Alex Liu
 Produced by Alex Liu, Lisa Logutenkow, and Jason Smith
 Executive producer: George Stromboulopoulos
 Graphics and titles by Jason Ford
 Post-production audio mix by Adrian Mottram, Company X Audio

Live concert
 Filmed at The Mod Club Theatre in Toronto on May 10, 2007
 Directed and edited by Greg Benedetto
 Shot by Shaun Axani, Aaron Champion, Peter Lehman, and Pat Moore
 Audio mixed by Greg Dawson, BWC Studios
 Live audio recording by 2V and Steve Lewin
 Guitar tech, keyboards, and samples by Haris Cehajic

Tour journals
 Shot by Haris Cehajic, Greg Benedetto, and Moneen
 Edited by Kenny Bridges and Greg Benedetto
 Selected music recorded by Kenny Bridges

External links
 Official band website

References

Moneen video albums
Concert films
2008 video albums
Albums produced by Brian McTernan